The sixth Annual American Music Awards were held January 12, 1979.

Winners and nominees

References
 http://theenvelope.latimes.com/extras/lostmind/year/1979/1979ama.htm

1979